Rohilkund and Kumaon Railway (R&KR) was a metre gauge railway in India covering a total network of . It was owned and worked by the Rohilkund and Kumaon Railway Company (registered 6 October 1882). The Rohilkund and Kumaon Railway was transferred to the Government of India and merged into the Oudh and Tirhut Railway on 1 January 1943.

History 

The original main line from Bhojeepura (near Bareilly) opened in 1884 and ran  in a north-westerly direction to Kathgodam. The railway was progressively extended, and by 1912 its network covered .

The R&KR was company owned and worked from formation in 1882. In 1883 Alexander Izat was appointed Director. Prior to this he was employed by the Railway Branch - Public Works Department (PWD) where he had served in various parts of India and was instrumental in initiating and carrying out many metre-gauge extensions. He represented R&KR at the Indian Railway Conference Association and remained as Director, until his retirement in 1904. In 1918 he is recorded as being R&KR Chairman with headquarters in London.
 
The R&KR remained a private company until nationalisation in 1943, when it was amalgamated with the Bengal and North-Western Railway (B&NWR), with which it had been closely associated, and the Lucknow-Bareilly State Railway, to form the Oudh and Tirhut Railway (O&TR). In turn, in 1952, the Oudh and Tirhut Railway became part of 'North Eastern Railway', a zone of Indian Railways.

The R&KR had working agreements with both the metre gauge Lucknow-Bareilly State Railway and the narrow gauge Powayan Light Railway. The three railways used shared facilities but retained separate identities.

Lines operated by R&KR
Bhojeepura-Kathgodam R&KR Mainline  from Bhojeepura (near Bareilly) to Kathgodam, 1884; 
Kasganj Extension Line from  Bareilly to Soron, 1885; to Kasganj, 1906;  
Ramnagar Extension Line from Moradabad to Ramnagar, 1907–8;  
Kashipur Extension Line  from Lalkua to Kashipur, 1907; 
Shahjahanpur Extension Line from Pilibhit  1911; reaching Shahjahanpur 1916; 
Lucknow-Bareilly State Railway, from 1891, a metre gauge railway, which formed an alternative Northern Loop between the cities of Lucknow and Bareilly to the broad gauge main line of the Oudh and Rohilkhand Railway.
Powayan Light Railway, from 17 December 1900, a  narrow gauge line of  length.
The 'Philibhit - Shahjahanpur Section’  was constructed by R&KR as  Shahjahanpur Extension Lin, opened 1911-16  - see above; the extension to Sitapur was constructed in 1916. 
 Dudhwa Branch Extension and Ramnager Ghat Extension, proposed in 1895 by the Agents, the R&KR, on behalf of the Lucknow-Bareilly State Railway (LBSR).
 Pilibhit-Barmedo Branch, surveyed in 1903 by the Agents, the R&KR, on behalf of the Lucknow-Bareilly State Railway (LBSR)

Rolling stock
In 1936, the company owned 76 locomotives, 230 coaches and 2845 goods wagons.

Classification
It was labeled as a Class I railway according to Indian Railway Classification System of 1926.

Conversion to broad gauge 

The railway lines were converted to  broad gauge starting from 1990s to 2010s.

References

External links
 Rohilkund and Kumaon Railway on FIBIS
L/AG/46/35  "Records of the India Office relating to the Rohilkund and Kumaon Railway Company; 1882-1931"
L/F/7/2382-2391  "Collection 380: Rohilkund and Kumaon Railway, date unspecified"

Metre gauge railways in India
Defunct railway companies of India
History of rail transport in Uttar Pradesh
Railway companies established in 1882
Railway companies disestablished in 1943
Transport in Haldwani-Kathgodam
Transport in Bareilly
1882 establishments in India
1943 disestablishments in India